Lapach is a rural locality (a village) in Sosnovskoye Rural Settlement, Vologodsky District, Vologda Oblast, Russia. The population was 8 as of 2002.

Geography 
Lapach is located 23 km west of Vologda (the district's administrative centre) by road. Novy Istochnik is the nearest rural locality.

References 

Rural localities in Vologodsky District